Umar Sani Labaran, also known as Umar Gombe (born April 5, 1983, in Gombe, Gombe State, Nigeria) is a Nigerian actor, filmmaker, and director who has appeared in over a hundred movies as well as a number of television and comedy shows. Gombe is the first program manager for Northflix, a Hausa movie streaming app. He has appeared in films, television shows, radio shows, and comedy shows. He has been nominated for best supporting actor several times and has won several other awards.

Early life and education
Umar Gombe was born to the Kano family on April 5, 1983 in Gombe, Nigeria. He is the son of Malam Sani Labaran, a farmer, an elderstateman and member of the Arewa Consultative Forum. From 1986 to 1998, he attended nursery, primary, and secondary schools in Gombe, then in Bauchi State. He continued his education at Bayero University Kano, where he earned diplomas in Public Administration and Data Processing & Information Technology. Umar has a Bachelor of Science in Information Technology and Business Information System from Middlesex University Dubai and is currently pursuing an MBA at Nigeria's National Open University.

In 2014, Umar Gombe participated in a film training program at the Asian Academy of Film & Television, Noida in India, a United Nations Program, alongside other Kannywood actors such as Falalu A Dorayi, Ali Nuhu, Ishaq Sidi Ishaq and Ibrahim Mandawari.

Acting career
Umar made his debut in Hausa films in 2001 with Shaida, eventually becoming a leading actor in Fasaha Films before moving on to ISI Films, which was founded by renowned filmmaker Ishaq Sidi Ishaq, and later Kumbo Productions, which produced the blockbuster film Sanafahna, that was shot in Nigeria and the Niger. He appeared in several Kumbo Productions films, including Armala, Noor, and Sanafahna.

Umar Gombe rose to prominence after appearing in Netflix's Nollywood English film, Tenant of the House, directed by Kunle Afolayan and Adieu Salut, as well as other Hausa films such as Kwalla, Lambar Girma, Noor, Lissafi, Iko, and In Zaki So Ni. With roles in films such as Lissafi, Noor, Mati A Zazzau, Kishiyata, Fati, Wakili, Hauwa Kulu, and the television series Gidan Badamasi, Umar has established himself as one of Kannywood's most talented and versatile actors. He also had a significant role in the award-winning Dadin Kowa television series, which was the first Hausa language series to air on Arewa24. Umar also featured in the Nigerian family magazine show, Ongacious season 2.

Umar Sani Labaran was appointed caretaker chairman of the Motion Pictures Practitioners Association of Nigeria in 2021, and later became the body's National Assistant Secretary following its election in 2022.

Filmography
Gombe made his film debut in the 2001 drama film Shaida, which helped him rise to fame and gain public recognition from many in the industry, which later helped him gain recognition and begin appearing in upcoming Hausa movies. In 2014, he made his television debut in the award-winning drama series Dadin Kowa on Arewa24, followed by a starring role in Netflix Kunle Afolayan's Tenant Of The House, a film about power conspiracies, dangerous romance, girl-child education, and, of course, conspiracy theory. In 2022, he made his first major appearance in Falalu Dorayi's award-winning controversial comedy television series Gidan Badamasi on Arewa24.

Gombe rose to prominence after appearing in both Gidan Badamasi and Noor, a film about surrogacy to address social issues directed by Faika Ibrahim Rahi, an award-winning female director.

Film

Television

Voice Over

References

External links
 

1983 births
Living people
Nigerian film actors
Nigerian male film actors
Hausa-language mass media
Male actors in Hausa cinema
Actors in Hausa cinema
21st-century Nigerian actors
21st-century Nigerian male actors
Kannywood actors
Nigerian film producers
Nigerian film directors
People from Gombe State
20th-century births